Jean Van Der Wouwer (born 1910, date of death unknown) was a Belgian ice hockey player. He competed in the men's tournament at the 1928 Winter Olympics.

References

External links
 
 

1910 births
Year of death missing
Ice hockey players at the 1928 Winter Olympics
Olympic ice hockey players of Belgium
Place of birth missing